Elizabeth Garvan is a camogie player, scorer of 3-6 of Cork's total of 5–7 in the All Ireland final of 1970. She won further All Ireland senior medals in 1971, 1972 and 1973.

Career
She was still at school when chosen to play for Cork in the Munster championship of 1968 and for Munster in the Gael Linn Cup the following autumn, winning the Munster camogie player of the year award en route. She won Ashbourne Cup medals with UCC in their 1971-4 three-in-a-row.

References

External links
 Camogie.ie Official Camogie Association Website
 Wikipedia List of Camogie players

Cork camogie players
Living people
Year of birth missing (living people)
UCC camogie players